Martina Schild (born 26 October 1981, in Brienz) is a Swiss alpine skier competing in downhill and super-G.

At the 2006 Winter Olympics, she won the silver medal in the women's downhill. She placed 6th in the women's super-G.

She is the granddaughter of skier Hedy Schlunegger (1923–2003), who was the Olympic downhill champion of 1948. Due to persistent back problems, Martina Schild announced her retirement from active ski racing before the start of the 2013/14 season.

World Cup victories

References

External links 

 
 

1981 births
Swiss female alpine skiers
Alpine skiers at the 2006 Winter Olympics
Olympic alpine skiers of Switzerland
Medalists at the 2006 Winter Olympics
Olympic medalists in alpine skiing
Olympic silver medalists for Switzerland
People from Brienz
Living people
Sportspeople from the canton of Bern
21st-century Swiss women